Yukio  is a masculine Japanese given name.

Possible writings
Yukio can be written using different combinations of kanji characters. Here are some examples: 

幸夫, "happiness, man"
幸生, "happiness, live"
幸男, "happiness, man"
幸雄, "happiness, male"
行夫, "to go, man"
行男, "to go, man"
行雄, "to go, male"
之夫, "of, man"
之男, "of, man"
之雄, "of, male"
由起夫, "reason, to rise, man"
由紀夫, "reason, chronicle, man"
由記雄, "reason, scribe, male"
悠紀夫, "long time, chronicle, man"
雪雄, "snow, male"

The name can also be written in hiragana ゆきお or katakana ユキオ.

Notable people with the name

, Japanese pocket billiards player
, pseudonym of Akiyuki Nosaka (野坂 昭如), Japanese novelist, singer, lyricist, and politician
, Japanese politician who was Governor of Tokyo
, Japanese baseball player
, youngest-known Japanese Kamikaze pilot killed in World War II
, Japanese politician
, Japanese gymnast
, Japanese video game developer
, Japanese equestrian
, Japanese popular singer
, Japanese Prime Minister
, Japanese cook and television presenter
, Japanese lawyer
, Japanese gymnast
, Japanese politician
, Japanese motorcycle racer
, Japanese soldier
, Japanese ski jumper
, Japanese rower
, Japanese writer
, Japanese rugby football player
, Japanese theatre director
, Japanese boxer
 Yukio Okutsu (1921–2003), Hawaiian soldier who won the US Congressional Medal of Honor
, Japanese politician
 Yukio Peter (born 1984), Nauruan weightlifter
, Russian sumo wrestler
, Japanese mixed martial artist and professional wrestler
, Japanese boxer
, Japanese naval aviator who led the first official kamikaze attack
Yukio Shimoda (1921–1981), American actor
, Japanese photographer
, Japanese Supreme Court justice
, Japanese baseball player
, Japanese judoka
, Japanese politician
, Japanese musician
, Japanese murderer
 Yukio Yung, pseudonym of Terry Burrows, English writer and musician

Fictional characters
Yukio (雪緒), a heroine in the X-Men comics
Yukio, female character in the Eric Van Lustbader novel, The Ninja
 (Johnny) in the anime Mahoraba
Yukio Mashimi in the anime Teenage Mutant Ninja Turtles
 in the anime Digimon
 in the manga Beck
, the twin character of the main protagonist Rin Okumura from the anime/manga, Blue Exorcist
, a character from the anime/manga, Black Lagoon
, one of the main antagonists in the anime/manga, Kaiji
, also known as "Fake Akagi", a character from the anime/manga, Akagi

Other
5513 Yukio, asteroid
"Death and Night and Blood (Yukio)", a song by The Stranglers from Black and White

Japanese masculine given names